The Rock 'n' Roll Seattle Marathon is an annual marathon held in Seattle, Washington, since 2009.  The race weekend also includes a half marathon and a 5K.

It is part of the Rock 'n' Roll Marathon Series organized by Advance Publications' Ironman Group.

The 2020 edition of the race was cancelled due to the coronavirus pandemic.

The 2022 edition was moved to the suburb of Bellevue and took place over Labor Day Weekend in early September. It featured a half-marathon and 5K in lieu of the full marathon.

Winners

References

External links
 Rock 'n' Roll Seattle Marathon

Marathons in the United States
Sports competitions in Seattle
Seattle Center
Recurring sporting events established in 2009
2009 establishments in Washington (state)